Cantabria Baloncesto was a professional basketball team who played during five seasons in Liga ACB. The team was also known as Cantabria Lobos.

From 1975 to 2004 the team was based and played in Torrelavega, but after the 2003-04 season the Cantabria Lobos moved to Santander, Cantabria.

In 2008, the team renounced their spot in the LEB Oro and played in LEB Bronce. After that season, Cantabria Baloncesto ceased in activity but was not dissolved.

Season by season

Trophies and awards

Trophies
Copa Príncipe de Asturias: (1)
1997
LEB Bronce: (1)
2009
Copa LEB Bronce: (1)
2009

Individual awards
LEB Oro MVP
Bob Harstad – 1997

Notable players
 Joaquín Ruiz Lorente
 Mario Boni
 Bob Harstad
 Mike Iuzzolino
 Marc Jackson
 Cuthbert Victor
 Marcelinho Machado

External links
Cantabria Baloncesto unofficial website
Federación Española de Baloncesto

Cantabria
Cantabria
Cantabria
Cantabria
Cant
1975 establishments in Spain